Sweet Crude are an indie pop and rock band formed in 2013 in New Orleans, Louisiana. The lyrics of their songs combine English and Louisiana French, a dialect spoken by members of singer Alexis Marceau's family.

The band released their debut album, Créatures, early in 2017. They toured before and after the release, hitting Festival du Voyageur, Gasparilla Pirate Festival, Savannah Stopover, and Les Francofolies de La Rochelle.

In 2019, Sweet Crude signed with Verve Forecast. The following year, they released their second album and major label debut, Officiel/Artificiel. The album was preceded by the single "Déballez". Sweet Crude promoted the album through media appearances, although plans to tour were delayed by the COVID-19 pandemic.

In 2022, the band collaborated with Big Freedia on the song "Take it Back".

References

Indie rock musical groups from Louisiana
Musical groups from New Orleans
Verve Forecast Records artists
Musical groups established in 2013
2013 establishments in Louisiana